Kai-Markus Müller is a German neuroscientist, entrepreneur, and professor. He is currently Professor of Consumer Behavior at HFU Business School in Villingen-Schwenningen, Germany. Müller previously acted as founder and CEO of The Neuromarketing Labs, a consumer neuroscience research company based in Aspach, Germany. He is known for having developed an EEG-based research technique for measuring willingness to pay. He is an alumnus of consulting firm Simon-Kucher & Partners.

Education
Müller earned his PhD in neural and behavioral sciences in 2010 from the International Max Planck Research School in Tübingen for his dissertation research conducted at the National Institute of Mental Health.

Selected works

References

External links 
 

German neuroscientists
Year of birth missing (living people)
Living people